The Black Flame, released in 2006, is an album by Swedish heavy metal band Wolf.

Track listing
"I Will Kill Again" (Stålvind / Goding) - 4:59
"At the Graveyard" (Stålvind) - 4:25
"Black Magic" (Stålvind) - 5:19
"The Bite" (Stålvind / Goding) - 5:07
"Make Friends with Your Nightmares" (Stålvind) - 5:10
"Demon" (Stålvind / Goding) - 5:03
"The Dead" (Stålvind / Goding / Losbäck / Kellgren) - 4:23
"Seize the Night" (Stålvind) - 4:08
"Steelwinged Savage Reaper" (Stålvind / Goding / Losbäck) - 3:09
"Children of the Black Flame" (Stålvind / Goding) - 5:50

Credits

Band line-up

 Niklas Stålvind        -     Guitar & Lead vocals
 Johannes Losbäck       -  Guitar & Backing vocals
 Mikael Goding            -    Bass guitar
 Tobias Kellgren        -    Drums

External links
 Wolf's Homepage

2006 albums
Wolf (band) albums
Albums produced by Fredrik Nordström